At the 1924 Winter Olympics one individual Nordic combined event was contested. It was held on Saturday, February 2, 1924 (cross-country skiing) and on Monday, February 4, 1924 (ski jumping). Unlike today the ski jump was the last event held. Both events were also individual medal events. The winner, Thorleif Haug was also the winner of both cross-country skiing races, and the podium was identical to that in the 50 km cross-country.

Medalists

Results

Final standings

Participating nations
A total of 30 Nordic combined skiers from nine nations competed at the Chamonix Games:

References

External links
International Olympic Committee results database
Official Official Olympic Report
sports-reference
 

 
1924 Winter Olympics events
1924
1924 in Nordic combined
Nordic combined competitions in France
Men's events at the 1924 Winter Olympics